The 2019 Cotton Bowl Classic was a college football bowl game played on December 28, 2019, with kickoff at 12:00 p.m. EST (11:00 a.m. local CST) on ESPN. It was the 84th edition of the Cotton Bowl Classic, and was one of the 2019–20 bowl games concluding the 2019 FBS football season. Sponsored by the Goodyear Tire and Rubber Company, the game was officially known as the Goodyear Cotton Bowl Classic.

Teams
The participants were selected by the College Football Playoff selection committee on December 8, 2019. This was the first meeting between the Memphis and Penn State programs.

Memphis Tigers

Memphis entered the game with a 12–1 record (7–1 in conference), ranked 15th in the AP Poll. The Tigers tied with Navy for first place of the West Division of the American Athletic Conference (AAC). Due to their win over Navy during the regular season, Memphis advanced to the AAC Championship Game, where they defeated Cincinnati, 29–24.

Memphis was selected to the Cotton Bowl as the highest-ranked team from the Group of Five conferences, a spot they secured by winning the AAC championship. This was Memphis' first Cotton Bowl Classic, as well as their first New Year's Six game overall. At the time the Tigers received their bowl invitation, the status of head coach Mike Norvell was unclear, as he had accepted an offer to become the new head coach of the Florida State Seminoles. On December 9, Norvell announced that he would not coach Memphis in the bowl, allowing interim head coach Ryan Silverfield to do so. On December 13, it was announced that the interim tag would be removed and that Silverfield was being hired as the new head coach of Memphis.

Penn State Nittany Lions

Penn State entered the game ranked 13th in the AP Poll, with a 10–2 record (7–2 in conference). The Nittany Lions finished second in the Big Ten's East Division. They split their four games against ranked opponents, defeating Iowa and Michigan while losing to Minnesota and Ohio State.

Penn State was selected to the Cotton Bowl as the highest-ranked team not already selected to a New Year's Six bowl. This was Penn State's fourth Cotton Bowl Classic; the Nittany Lions have a 2–0–1 record in the game, most recently their 1974 team winning the 1975 Cotton Bowl Classic over Baylor, 41–20.

Game summary

Statistics

References

External links

Game statistics at statbroadcast.com

Cotton Bowl Classic
Cotton Bowl Classic
Cotton Bowl Classic
Cotton Bowl Classic
Memphis Tigers football bowl games
Penn State Nittany Lions football bowl games